José Manuel Martins (2 September 1906 – 5 September 1994) was a Portuguese footballer. He played as a forward.

Football career 
Martins gained 11 caps and scored 4 goals for Portugal and was playing in the 1928 Football Olympic Tournament. He made his debut against Hungary 26 December 1926 in Porto, in a 3–3 draw, there he scored 1 goal.

References

External links 
 
 
 Profile of José Martins 

1906 births
1994 deaths
Portuguese footballers
Association football forwards
Sporting CP footballers
Portugal international footballers
Olympic footballers of Portugal
Footballers at the 1928 Summer Olympics